Bossiaea bossiaeoides is a species of flowering plant in the family Fabaceae and is endemic to northern Australia. It is much-branched, glabrous shrub with broadly winged stems, winged and lobed cladodes, leaves reduced to small scales, and yellow flowers, sometimes with orange or red blotches.

Description

Taxonomy
This species was first formally described in 1842 by George Bentham from an unpublished description by Allan Cunningham who gave it the name Acacia bossiaeoides in the London Journal of Botany. Cunningham's specimens were collected near the mouth of the Liverpool River in the Northern Territory. In 1971, Arthur Bertram Court changed the name to Bossiaea bossiaeoides in the journal Muelleria. The specific epithet (bossiaeoides) means "bossiaea-like", the species having originally been placed in the genus Acacia.

Distribution and habitat
Bossiaea bossiaeoides grows in open woodland or low scrub, on sand over sandstone, on dry stony hillside, often in dry stream beds or the banks of watercourses. It is widespread in tropical Australia, from islands off the coast of north-western Western Australia, through northern Western Australia and the Northern Territory to north-western Queensland.

Conservation status
This bossiaea is classified as "not threatened" by the Government of Western Australia Department of Parks and Wildlife, and as "least concern under the Northern Territory Government Territory Parks and Wildlife Conservation Act 1976 and the Queensland Government Nature Conservation Act 1992''.

References

External links 
 The Australasian Virtual Herbarium – Bossiaea bossiaeoiedes occurrence data

bossiaeoides
Flora of Queensland
Flora of Western Australia
Flora of the Northern Territory
Plants described in 1842
Taxa named by George Bentham